Megachile pontica is a species of bee in the family Megachilidae. It was described by Alfken in 1933.

References

pontica
Insects described in 1933